Con is a short form of the following given names
Cornelius
Conrad
Constantine
Connor

Con is also a given name on its own that may refer to
Con Conrad (1891–1938), American songwriter and producer
Con Colleano (1899–1973), Australian tightrope walker
Con Cremin (1908–1987), Irish diplomat
Con Lehane (Irish republican) (1911-1983), Irish nationalist
Con O'Neill (diplomat) (1912–1988), British civil servant and diplomat
Con Houlihan (1925–2012), Irish sportswriter
Con Constantine (born 1945), Cypriot-Australian businessman
Con Coughlin, (born 1955), British journalist and author
Con Boutsianis (born 1971), Australian football player 
Con Blatsis (born 1977), Greek-Australian football player
Con Sullivan, New Zealand rugby player
Con Kolivas, Australian anaesthetist

Con is also a surname of the following people
Mac Con, a High King of Ireland
Marin Con (born 1985), Croatian footballer

See also
Conn (name)